The Northern Tasmanian Football Association is an Australian rules football competition in northern Tasmania. This league is not related to the older version of the NTFA, which merged in 1987 with the NWFU to form the Northern Tasmanian Football League.

This competition was formed in 1996 basically as a change of name from the Northern section of the Tasmanian Amateur Football League. In 1996 the Tasmanian Amateurs voted to allow the payment of players. As players were allowed to be paid then they were no longer an amateur competition. The board decided to adopt the name "Northern Tasmanian Football Association" because it was available and the former NTFA hadn't used the name for ten years.

In 1998 six clubs from the defunct Esk-Deloraine FA joined the competition.

Clubs

Current

Premier Division
Until 2018, it was known as Division One.

Division 1
Until 2018, it was known as Division Two.

Former
 Campbell Town - Recess from around 2006 to 2008 and then reformed in Oatlands District Football Association in 2010. Division 2 premiers in 1998, 2000 and 2001.
 St Marys - Recess since 2002.
 Hagley - Recess since 2001.
 Northern Districts - Recess since 2000.
 Cressy - Recess since 2000.
 Exeter - Recess since 1991.
 Fingal Valley - Recess since 2015. Division 2 premiers in 2007 and 2008.
 Prospect Hawks - Recess since 2018.
 Tamar Cats - Recess since 2019. Division 2 premiers in 2003.

Competition
The current competition consists of 18 rounds, with each club playing 16 games, followed by 4 rounds of finals.

Premier Division

2007

2008

2009

2010

2011

2012

2013

2014

2015

2016

2017

2018

2019

2021

Division One

2007

2008

2009

2010

2011

2012

2013

2014 

In a match between Old Scotch and Fingal Valley played on 10 May, the match was abandoned prior to half time because of a fight between the players of both teams.

On 23 May the NTFA Board met in relation to that match and advised the following:

 The match would be declared void with no premiership points awarded for the game, no points for and against counted for the game, and no NTFA Best and Fairest votes awarded for the game.
 Fingal would be fined $6000 and forfeit 24 premiership points; Old Scotch would be fined $4000 and forfeit 16 premiership points. The previously suspended fines from 2013 for each club would also be imposed.
 Until the end of the 2015 season, three umpires plus a reserve umpire will be allocated to all future matches between these two clubs with the additional cost be split equally between the two clubs.
 Until the end of the 2015 season, all matches between these two clubs will be videoed from at least two angles and the additional cost be equally split between the two clubs.

2015

2016

2017

2018

2019

2021

Women's

2019

2020

2021

References

External links
 http://www.ntfa.org.au/
 Facebook page

Australian rules football competitions in Tasmania